Human Enhancement (2009) is a non-fiction book edited by philosopher Nick Bostrom and philosopher and bioethicist Julian Savulescu. Savulescu and Bostrom write about the ethical implications of human enhancement and to what extent it is worth striving towards.

References

2009 non-fiction books
Ethics books
Transhumanist books
Works by Nick Bostrom
Edited volumes